Andre Riddick (born February 1, 1973) is a retired American professional basketball player. He is the ULEB Cup's All-Time Leader for rebounds (383), steals (116) and blocks (122) and also has the highest ULEB Cup percentage of blocks (2 blocks per game).  He played for the University of Kentucky from 1991 to 1995.

Tenure at Kentucky
Nicknamed "The Rejector" Andre Riddick held the single season block record at 83 for Kentucky together with Melvin Turpin until it was broken by Anthony Davis in 2012, and he held the Kentucky single game block record of 9 together with Sam Bowie until it was broken by Nerlens Noel in 2013.  A notoriously bad free throw shooter, the standard Riddick set has been invoked more than once when a Kentucky player had a bad night at the line.    Riddick often performed a shuffle after he dunked the basketball.

Riddick and his Kentucky teammates made the NCAA Final Four in 1993.  During Kentucky's 1995 NCAA tournament Elite Eight game against North Carolina, Riddick angrily confronted Rasheed Wallace after Wallace hit him with his elbow, resulting in a technical foul issued to Walter McCarty, a call hotly disputed by former Kentucky coach Rick Pitino.

Coaching career
Riddick continued to coach in the Cincinnati area with the private coaching service CoachUp.

References

1973 births
Living people
American expatriate basketball people in Belgium
American expatriate basketball people in France
American expatriate basketball people in Japan
American expatriate basketball people in the Dominican Republic
American expatriate basketball people in Venezuela
Basketball players from New York City
Centers (basketball)
JDA Dijon Basket players
Kentucky Wildcats men's basketball players
Parade High School All-Americans (boys' basketball)
Paris Racing Basket players
Spirou Charleroi players
Sportspeople from Brooklyn
Trotamundos B.B.C. players
American men's basketball players
Bishop Loughlin Memorial High School alumni